Baraa Najib al-Ruba'i is an Iraqi politician and a member of the National Assembly of Iraq who was proposed as a possible Defense Minister in May 2006.

He comes from a princely family that oversees the Rabi’a tribe. His father, Muhammad Najib ar-Ruba'i was a prominent officer under the monarchy who was appointed chairman of the three-member Presidential Council by General Abdul Karim Qassem. A graduate of Sandhurst military college in Britain, he worked with the CIA in Amman on the 1996 coup attempt along with Iyad Allawi’s Iraqi National Accord.

Sources
 

Graduates of the Royal Military Academy Sandhurst
Living people
Iraqi National Accord politicians
Members of the Council of Representatives of Iraq
Year of birth missing (living people)